The 2013 NCAA Division II women's basketball tournament was the 32nd annual tournament hosted by the NCAA to determine the national champion of Division II women's  collegiate basketball in the United States.

Ashland defeated Dowling in the championship game, 71–56, to claim the Eagles' first NCAA Division II national title.

The championship rounds were contested at Bill Greehey Arena on the campus of the St. Mary's University in San Antonio, Texas.

Regionals

Central - Topeka, Kansas
Location: Lee Arena Host: Washburn University

Southeast - Morrow, Georgia
Location: Athletics and Fitness Center Host: Clayton State University

East - Waltham, Massachusetts
Location: Dana Center Host: Bentley College

South Central - Grand Junction, Colorado
Location: Brownson Arena Host: Colorado Mesa University

West - Bellingham, Washington
Location: Sam Carver Gymnasium Host: Western Washington University

South - Davie, Florida
Location: University Center Host: Nova Southeastern University

Midwest - Ashland, Ohio
Location: Kates Gymnasium Host: Ashland University

Atlantic - Erie, Pennsylvania
Location: Hammermill Center Host: Gannon University

Elite Eight - San Antonio, Texas
Location: Bill Greehey Arena Host: Saint Mary's University

All-tournament team
 Kari Daugherty, Ashland
 Taylor Woods, Ashland
 Daiva Gerbec, Ashland
 Julia Koppl, Dowling
 Connie Simmons, Dowling
 Danielle Wilson, Dowling
 Nicole Caggiano, Dowling

See also
 2013 NCAA Division I women's basketball tournament
 2013 NCAA Division III women's basketball tournament
 2013 NAIA Division I women's basketball tournament
 2013 NAIA Division II women's basketball tournament
 2013 NCAA Division II men's basketball tournament

References
 2013 NCAA Division II women's basketball tournament jonfmorse.com

 
NCAA Division II women's basketball tournament
2013 in Texas
Basketball in San Antonio